, originally spelled in kanji as  with his original full name being unknown, is a fictional character in Capcom's Street Fighter series. Ken is the best friend and rival of Ryu, who has also appeared in all Street Fighter games. Ken's goal is to test his power against many different fighters, as he strives to become stronger. He uses improved Shoryuken (dragon punch) techniques.

Ken's physical appearance and biographical traits were inspired by American martial artist Joe Lewis. He  appeared in other game franchises, such as Namco × Capcom, Project X Zone, Project X Zone 2, and Super Smash Bros., and also appeared in films such as Street Fighter: Legacy, Street Fighter: Assassin's Fist, Street Fighter: Resurrection, Street Fighter: World Warrior, Wreck-It Ralph and Goosebumps 2: Haunted Halloween.

Character design 
Starting from the original Street Fighter, Ken has been consistently depicted with neck-length blond hair (actually dyed blond), black or dark brown eyebrows and wears a red sleeveless keikogi with a black belt.  In the original Street Fighter, Ken fought barefoot and wore yellow arm bands without gloves (unlike his rival Ryu, who originally wore red slippers with sparring gloves, and began fighting barefooted in subsequent games). For Street Fighter III, Ken was supposed to be given new techniques but the staff refrained from it as they found him overpowered.

By the time of Street Fighter V, Ken's appearance has undergone the first major design change in the character's history. Ken's gi top now hangs around his waist and he wears a black v-neck training shirt with several red linings in its place. He sports black sparring gloves and has his hair tied back in a topknot instead of hanging loose which it was grown into medium length after the events of Street Fighter III series and now wears black ankle wraps with red linings instead of barefoot. For this game, Capcom wanted to differentiate these two characters' moves since they have been seen as "clones". He added "Ken's more of the hothead. He's the one that's gonna rush you down and be in your face, so his V-Skill is a run move that can be used to constantly pressure your opponent."

Appearances

In video games

Street Fighter games
Ken made his first appearance in 1987 in the original Street Fighter and is the only other playable character in the game aside from Ryu. He is characterized as the best friend, and rival of the main character, Ryu, who trained under the same master (a character whose identity would later be fleshed out as Gouken). The single-player tournament can only be played with Ken after the second player defeats the first player in a two-player match. Ken was also named one of the best fighters in the game.

Ken and Ryu, along with former final boss Sagat, were the only characters from the original game to return in the game's true sequel, Street Fighter II, in 1991 - here, Ken is invited to participate in the World Warrior tournament by Ryu, having already moved away from Japan to live in America. In Ken's ending, he ends up marrying his girlfriend Eliza. Street Fighter II was a breakaway hit for Capcom, leading to the production of revised editions of the same game which included Champion Edition and Hyper Fighting in 1992, Super Street Fighter II in 1993 and Super Turbo in 1994, which all follow the same plot. Numerous spinoff products were made as well during the game's popularity: when Capcom licensed Hasbro to produce a line of action figures, Ken was given the surname "Masters". The full name Ken Masters was used in the animated Street Fighter II movie and in the Street Fighter II V series before being canonized in the video games with Street Fighter Alpha 2.

No new Street Fighter game was released until 1995's Street Fighter Alpha. Street Fighter Alpha was a prequel to the Street Fighter II series, and it fleshed out the established Street Fighter II characters as well as reintroducing characters from the original Street Fighter and the beat-em-up game Final Fight. Alpha features a younger Ken who is searching for Ryu, having recently won the first "World Warrior" tournament in the events of the original Street Fighter. In Ken's ending in the original Alpha, he defeats Ryu and heads back to America, where he meets Eliza. Alpha was followed by its own line of sequels: Alpha 2, which follows the same plot as in the original Alpha (with a revised ending for Ken) and Alpha 3, which takes place after the events in the first two games. In Alpha 3, Ken is featured in the numerous characters' storylines within the game.

Ken's following appearance is in Street Fighter III, in which he has a son (Mel) and his own student (Sean). In Street Fighter IV, Ken enters into the world tournament while waiting for the birth of Mel. Ken also appears in Street Fighter V, when he take parts of a final raid on Shadaloo's main base, when Mel was two years old. In Street Fighter 6, set after the events of III, Ken is framed for criminal conspiracy, forcing him to go into hiding to protect his family until he can find those responsible.

Other games
In 1990, Capcom produced an action game for the Nintendo Entertainment System titled Street Fighter 2010: The Final Fight. The Japanese version of the game starred an original character named Kevin Straker, a cyborg policeman who fought against alien creatures in the future. When Capcom released 2010 in North America, the main character's identity was changed from Kevin to Ken, with the game's story rewritten to imply that he was the same Ken from the original Street Fighter. Other than that, the game has little or no plot ties to the original Street Fighter and its part in the canonical Street Fighter series is disputed.

Outside the mainstream Street Fighter games, Ken appears in the Street Fighter EX games and in the mobile game Street Fighter: Puzzle Spirits. He also appears in crossover titles like X-Men vs. Street Fighter, Marvel Super Heroes vs. Street Fighter, Marvel vs Capcom 2: New Age of Heroes, the Capcom vs. SNK series, and Street Fighter X Tekken. (In the game Marvel vs. Capcom, Ryu is able to access Ken's moveset when the player enters a certain command.) He also appears in the Street Fighter II: The Animated Movie and arcade versions of Street Fighter: The Movie. In SNK Playmore's fighting game SNK vs. Capcom: SVC Chaos he has an alter-ego named , who later made his full Street Fighter debut in Ultra Street Fighter II: The Final Challengers. Ken is featured in the tactical role-playing games Namco × Capcom, Project X Zone, and Project X Zone 2. Ken also makes a cameo as a Trophy in Super Smash Bros. for Nintendo 3DS and Wii U, as part of the Ryu DLC. He is playable in Super Smash Bros. Ultimate as an "echo fighter" or clone of Ryu.

In other media
He was voiced by Scott McNeil in the Street Fighter animated series.  In Street Fighter II V, he was voiced by Jimmy Theodore in the Animaze dub and Jason Douglas in the ADV Films dub and in Street Fighter II: The Movie, he was voiced by Eddie Frierson.  He was voiced by Kazuya Ichijo in Japanese and Steven Blum in the dub for the Street Fighter Alpha movie. In Street Fighter II V and the Street Fighter II animated movie, Ken is depicted with reddish hair.

Damian Chapa portrayed Ken in the 1994 Street Fighter movie, where he and Ryu (played by Byron Mann) are traveling con artists who steal money from wealthy crime bosses/lords and drug kingpins though various schemes such as selling modified toy guns. After the two unsuccessfully try to scam Shadaloo Tong leader Sagat, they are arrested by Allied Nations forces. Guile offers them their freedom in exchange for infiltrating Bison's base (whom Sagat works for as an arms supplier) and revealing its location so that the AN can make a military strike and free the hostages captured earlier in the film. When Guile eventually infiltrates Bison's base and chaos ensues, Ryu and Ken try to help free the hostages but split up when the AN forces arrive, Ken opting to flee for their lives while Ryu desires to stay behind and fight. Ken later comes to Ryu's aid when he is ambushed by Vega and Sagat. While Ryu defeats Vega, Ken defeats Sagat. In the aftermath, though Guile intends to free Ryu and Ken, they decide to stay in Shadaloo to help the AN clear up what Bison has left in his wake.

Reuben Langdon provides Ken's voice in the Street Fighter IV series, V, and Super Smash Bros. Ultimate, and plays him in the live-action short film Street Fighter x Tekken: The Devil Within.

British actor Christian Howard portrayed Ken in the live-action short film Street Fighter: Legacy, and reprised his role in the follow-up series Street Fighter: Assassin's Fist, Street Fighter: Resurrection and Street Fighter: World Warrior. Taking place to a time similar to Street Fighter Alpha, the younger Ken is shown to be arrogant and impatient, and was brought to Japan at a young age by his father (a friend of Gouken's) to Gouken's dojo following the death of his mother. He finds a book showing the techniques of the Satsui no Hado and is warned by Gouken not to use them. During a bout with Ryu, Ryu is taken over by the Satsui No Hado, forcing Ken to nearly kill him with a flaming Shoryuken. As Gouken sends his two students off, he trusts Ken to look after Ryu.

Ken made a cameo appearance in the Disney film Wreck-It Ralph, with Langdon reprising his role.

In the 2018 film Goosebumps 2: Haunted Halloween, Slappy the Dummy uses magic to bring actions figures of Ryu and Ken to life.

Promotion and reception
Ken artwork was featured on an officially licensed Nubytech/UDON joypad for the PlayStation 2, and a Mad Catz joypad for the PlayStation 3.

Ken has often been recognized as one of the best Street Fighter characters. IGN ranked Ken at number six in their "Top 25 Street Fighter Characters" article, noting his contrast to Ryu while subsequently questioning his lesser appeal, and stating "he's just as indispensable to the series as Ryu is. After all, could you imagine a Street Fighter game without him? Perhaps, but it probably still wouldn't be the same." GameDaily listed him at number six on their "Top 20 Street Fighter Characters of All Time" article, noting the contrast between himself and Ryu. The same site ranked him sixth along with Ryu in the Top 25 Capcom Characters of All Time with editor Robert Workman saying "It was just impossible to choose between one of these world warriors". Another feature, "Top 25 Gaming Hunks", situated Ken eighteenth, stating it was hard deciding between him and Ryu. In Gamest magazine in Japan, Ken ranked at ninth along with Blanka as "Best Characters of 1991" and at number 49 in "Top 50 Characters of 1996". In 2009 GamePro ranked Ryu and Ken as number nine in their list of the best palette-swapped video game characters, adding: "While some may have argued that Street Fighter 2's depiction of Ryu and Ken utilized palette swapping, a true palette swapping aficionado would know that only the original Street Fighter exploited the swapping of palettes." GamesRadar writer Tyler Wilde published an article focusing on Ken's and Ryu's development across the franchise under the title of "The evolution of Ken and Ryu." While comparing these two characters, IGN's Jesse Schedeen stated that Ken could "easily suffer from Luigi Syndrome" for his resemblance with Ryu, but thanks to the sequels, Ken gained his own fighting style separated from Ryu's.

Some sites have commented on Ken's techniques due to being relatively overpowered. The Guardian recommended Ken alongside Ryu for beginners in Street Fighter IV with Ken being better at close-up fights as a result of his powerful uppercuts. In a humor article by GameSpy, the Super Street Fighter II Turbo version of Ken was mentioned to have become unbalanced to the point he was the strongest character from the cast. In Street Fighter III: Third Strike, Ken was also noted to be one of the three more powerful characters from the game alongside Chun-Li and Yun. Similarly, Dave Cook from Now Gamer called him and Tekkens Eddy Gordo one of the most hated characters from their franchises due to their overpowered moves. In another article, Cook listed a fight between Ken and Eddy Gordo as one of the fights he wished to see in Street Fighter X Tekken calling it the "ultimate battle of super cheapness." UGO Networks placed Ken at #4 on their list of "Top 50 Street Fighter Characters", stating "If you're a fan of dragon punches, you play Ken.". Jeremy Parish of Polygon ranked 73 fighters from Super Smash Bros. Ultimate "from garbage to glorious", listing Ken as 62nd.

Legacy
Ken has also been popular thanks to the Evo Moment 37. With 26 seconds remaining, Wong had the option to run out the clock, but he was eager to end the match. To win the round, Wong attempted to hit Umehara's Ken with Chun-Li's multihit Super Art II move; the Houyoku-sen ("fanning phoenix-wing"). However, instead of avoiding it, Umehara chose to "Parry", a high-risk, high-reward technique which allows the defender to block an incoming attack without losing any health, but requires moving toward the opponent's direction in the same time a hit lands, within six of sixty frames of the impact animation – about a tenth of a second. Umehara had to predict when his opponent would start his Super Art Move, essentially making the first parry before the move even started, and then perform the same split-second timing on all 14 of the remaining hits. Umehara did so, and went on to counter a final kick of Chun-Li in mid-air before launching a 12-hit combo, capped by Ken's Super Art III; Shippuu Jinraikyaku ("hurricane thunderclap leg"), winning the match. Evo Moment #37 is frequently described as the most iconic and memorable moment in the history of competitive video gaming. Being at one point the most-watched competitive gaming moment of all time, Kotaku compared it to sports moments such as Babe Ruth's called shot and the Miracle on Ice. The downloadable online version of 3rd Strike, Street Fighter III: 3rd Strike Online Edition, features a challenge where players need to pull off the Daigo Parry.

Notes

References

Bibliography

Action film characters
Ansatsuken
Capcom protagonists
Fictional American people in video games
Fictional businesspeople in video games
Fictional Japanese American people
Fictional judoka
Fictional kenpō practitioners
Fictional kyokushin kaikan practitioners
Fictional male martial artists
Fictional martial artists in video games
Fictional shotokan practitioners
Fictional socialites
Fictional taekwondo practitioners
Male characters in video games
Street Fighter characters
Super Smash Bros. fighters
Video game characters introduced in 1987
Video game characters with fire or heat abilities
Video game mascots